Diedja Maglione Roque Barreto (born 22 September 1963), commonly known as Didi, is a Brazilian football coach and former goalkeeper.

She was part of the Brazil women's national football team. She competed at the 1996 Summer Olympics, playing one match as the understudy to Meg. At club level she played for Saad EC. In 1997 she joined São Paulo FC where she won state and national titles. She played in a 3–0 friendly defeat by the United States on 22 May 1999 at the Citrus Bowl in Orlando, Florida, while attached to the Lusa Sant'Anna club.

After her playing retirement she moved to the Chicago metropolitan area, where she coached in youth and college soccer.

See also
 Brazil at the 1996 Summer Olympics

References

External links
 
 leagueathletics.com
 

1963 births
Living people
Brazilian women's footballers
Brazil women's international footballers
Place of birth missing (living people)
Footballers at the 1996 Summer Olympics
Olympic footballers of Brazil
Women's association football goalkeepers
Saad Esporte Clube (women) players
São Paulo FC (women) players
Brazilian expatriate sportspeople in the United States
People from João Pessoa, Paraíba